William Purvis, probably better known as "Blind Willie"  (1752 – 20 July 1832), was a Tyneside concert hall song writer and performer in England at the end of the 18th and start of the 19th century. His most famous song is "Broom Buzzems". He became known later as the "ancient laureate of the Tyne" and was remembered in the songs of Robert Gilchrist (1797–1844) and Thomas Thompson (1773–1816).

Early life 
William Purvis was the son of John Purvis, a waterman, and Margaret Purvis (who died in All Saints Poorhouse aged over 100).  William was born early in the year of 1752 in Newcastle, and baptised at All Saints' Church on 16 February 1752.  He was either blind from birth, or very shortly after, although he often made comments from which the onlooker would think he could see.  Very rarely did he perform in the street, preferring to perform in ale houses, in which he would depend on the charity of the public, but as he seemed to bring trade and the public appeared to like his ditties this seemed an amicable arrangement.  He was apparently hatless in all weathers and to most of the locals and to his clientele he was just "Blind Willie".

Later life 
William Purvis was an inhabitant of the All Saints Poorhouse but wandered around much of the town, distinguishing every street, alley, house, or shop with astonishing exactness. Even when a tenancies changed, he soon discovered the name of the new tenant, and would, call it out the next time he passed. He was a great favourite of the local populace and few would pass him by in the street without recognition and a degree of sympathy. He died on 20 July 1832 at the age of 80.

Works 
His favourite appeared to be "Buy Broom Buzzems" or "Broom Besoms" which some said he composed, although others disputed this fact.  However, he made it his own, and added and removed extra simple verses to suit himself (and his audience)

Notes 
Much of the information on Blind Willie comes from the book Northumbrian Minstrelsy. This book, edited by J. Collingwood Bruce and John Stokoe, is a collection of ballads, melodies and small-pipe tunes of Northumbria. It was first published by the Society of Antiquaries of Newcastle upon Tyne in 1882 and contains notes of the songs and tunes.

This book quotes:

Other references appear in the Newcastle Monthly Chronicle and an edition of Volume 2 (pages 517 and 518) of 1888

This gives an interesting description of Blind Willie as:

There are mentions in two other articles in this same publication on Pages 80 and 517.

An article on page 353 and 354 of the Monthly Chronicle of 1889 entitled "View near the Close Gate 1826" mentioned "Blin'd Willie".

It states:

Another edition describes his antics in more detail, Willy as he entered a public house:

See also 
Geordie dialect words

References

External links
 The Newcastle Song Book or Tyne-Side Songster., W&T Fordyce Newcastle upon Tyne
 Conrad Bladey's Beuk O' Newcassel Sangs

1752 births
1832 deaths
English male singer-songwriters
People from Newcastle upon Tyne (district)
Musicians from Tyne and Wear